Springvale Township may refer to the following places in the United States:

 Springvale Township, Emmet County, Michigan
 Springvale Township, Isanti County, Minnesota
 Springvale Township, Barnes County, North Dakota
 Springvale Township, Logan County, Oklahoma

See also
Springvale (disambiguation)

Township name disambiguation pages